The Archiepiscopal Seminary of Vienna (German: Erzbischöfliches Priesterseminar Wien), commonly referred to in German as the Wiener Priesterseminar, is a Roman Catholic major seminary that serves as the seminary of the Archdiocese of Vienna. Founded in 1758 by the Archbishop of Vienna, Christoph Anton Migazzi, the seminary moved to its current building, the Haus Boltzmanngasse, in 1914. Today, the rector is Rev. Richard Tatzreiter and enrollment is 35.

History 
The Archiepiscopal Seminary of Vienna was founded in 1758 by Count Christoph Anton Migazzi, the Archbishop of Vienna, as the main seminary for the training of priests for the Archdiocese of Vienna. For many years, it was located in the Curhaus in Stephansplatz, the same square in Vienna where St. Stephen's Cathedral is located. The building was expanded in 1805 during the reign of Archbishop Sigismund Anton von Hohenwart in order to accommodate more seminarians. By 1912, the seminary had grown to 112 seminarians. 

During the reign of Cardinal Franz Xaver Nagl, the Haus Boltzmanngasse, a former hospital and later orphanage in the Alsergrund district of Vienna, was restored and expanded. The new archbishop, Friedrich Gustav Piffl, made the decision to move the seminary from Curhaus to Boltzmanngasse. The seminary made the move in the summer of 1914, and has remained in the new building ever since.

Beginning with the 2012–2013 academic year, seminarians from the Burgenländisches Seminary and St. Pölten Seminary will be living and studying in the Seminary of Vienna facilities. In 2014, the seminary had 35 seminarians.

Administration and organization 
Rev. Richard Tatzreiter is the seminary rector, and Rev. Markus Muth is vice rector. Rev. Michael Meßner, SJ, is the spiritual director, and Michael Sipka is the librarian.

Student life

Student body 
In 2014, there were 35 seminarians at the Seminary of Vienna. However, ins addition to this, there are a number of other seminarians from the Burgenländisches Seminary and St. Pölten Seminary, which are now located in the same building.

Notable people

Alumni 
 Hans Hermann Groër, Austrian Benedictine cardinal; Archbishop of Vienna
 Rudolf Henke, Austrian writer and producer at the Austrian Broadcasting Corporation
 Prince Alexander of Hohenlohe-Waldenburg-Schillingsfürst, German Roman Catholic priest
 Theodor Innitzer; Austrian cardinal and politician; Archbishop of Vienna
 Franz Jáchym, Austrian Roman Catholic bishop; coadjutor bishop of Vienna
 Joseph Kenner, Austrian artist and politician
 Blessed Franz Alexander Kern; Austrian Premonstratensian priest
 Nikolaus Krasa, Austrian Roman Catholic priest; Vicar General of the Archdiocese of Vienna
 Florian Kuntner, Austrian Roman Catholic bishop; Auxiliary Bishop of Vienna
 Štefan László, Austrian Roman Catholic bishop; Bishop of Eisenstadt
 Leopold Lentner, Austrian Roman Catholic priest and theologian; director of the Vienna Catechetical Institute
 Heinrich Maier, Austrian Roman Catholic priest and educator; member of the Austrian Resistance
 Godfried Marschall, Austrian Roman Catholic bishop; Vicar General and Auxiliary Bishop of Vienna
 Laurenz Mayer, Austrian Roman Catholic bishop; Auxiliary Bishop of Vienna
 Johannes Nedbal, Austrian Roman Catholic priest and theologian; rector of the Collegio Teutonico
 Konstantin Reymaier; Austrian Roman Catholic priest, composer, and organist
 Karl Rühringer, Moravian Roman Catholic bishop
 Wenzel Schanz, Austrian Roman Catholic priest and theologian; professor at the University of Vienna
 Franz Scharl, Austrian Roman Catholic bishop; Auxiliary Bishop of Vienna
 Anton Schiestl, Austrian Roman Catholic priest and art collector
 Johann Baptist Schneider, Austrian Roman Catholic bishop; Vicar General and Auxiliary Bishop of Vienna
 Blessed Anton Maria Schwartz, Austrian Roman Catholic priest; founder of the Pious Workers of St. Joseph Calasanctius of the Mother of God 
 Alois Schwarz, Austrian Roman Catholic bishop; Bishop of Gurk-Klagenfurt
 Vinzenz Eduard Milde; Austrian Roman Catholic archbishop; Bishop of Litomērice and Archbishop of Vienna
 Thomas Renner, Austrian Benedictine priest; abbot of Altenburg Abbey
 Stephan Turnovszky, Austrian Roman Catholic bishop; Auxiliary Bishop of Vienna
 Leopold Ungar, Austrian Roman Catholic priest; director of Caritas in the Archdiocese of Vienna
 Rudolf Weiler, Austrian Roman Catholic priest and theologian
 Raimund Weissensteiner, Austrian Roman Catholic priest and composer
 Michael Weninger, Austrian Roman Catholic priest and diplomat; Austrian Ambassador to Yugoslavia and Serbia and Montenegro
 Friedrich Wessely, Austrian Roman Catholic priest and theologian; professor at the University of Vienna
 Hermann Zschokke, Austrian Roman Catholic bishop; Auxiliary Bishop of Vienna

Faculty 
 Johann Kurz, Austrian Roman Catholic priest and educator; prefect of studies at the seminary from 1939 to 1941
 Maria Loley, Austrian social worker and educator; professor at the seminary from 1996 to 2003
 Heinrich Segur, Austrian Jesuit priest and educator; spiritual director at the seminary from 1966 to 1969

Rectors 
 Richard Tatzreiter (1 January 2011 – )

See also 
 Catholic Church in Austria
 List of Roman Catholic seminaries

References

External links 
 Official website

Baroque architecture in Vienna
Buildings and structures in Alsergrund
Education in Vienna
Educational institutions established in 1758
Religion in Vienna
Catholic seminaries
Catholic universities and colleges in Austria
Seminaries and theological colleges in Austria
Universities and colleges in Austria-Hungary
Universities and colleges in Vienna
1758 establishments in Austria